Finland will be represented by 39 athletes at the 2010 European Athletics Championships held in Barcelona, Spain.

Participants

Results

Medalists

References 
Participants list

Nations at the 2010 European Athletics Championships
2010
European Athletics Championships